"Jeepney Love Story" is a pop rock song performed by Filipina singer-songwriter Yeng Constantino. The song was written by Constantino and produced by Raimund Marasigan. It was released in June 2010 by Star Records as the third single from Constantino's third studio album, Lapit ("Come Closer").

Lyrics

"Jeepney Love Story" is a mid-tempo, pop rock song. The story of the song is about a handsome man who caught the attention of  Constantino, who embarked in the same jeep alongside her which she considered as love at first sight.

Music video

The music video for the song was released on September 9, 2010. The concept of the video was an inspired animated one, in which the video shows Ivan Dorschner of Pinoy Big Brother: Teen Clash 2010 as the guy in which the song is referring to. By the end of the video, Dorschner eventually disembarks the jeepney, and an unexpected cameo role by Filipino actor Piolo Pascual appears as a passenger, replacing the seat of Dorschner. It was directed by Avid Liongoren.

Live performances
In December 2011, Constantino performed at DWTM Magic 89.9 in celebration of their 25th anniversary. She performed the song together with her bandmates, Morning Glory on Music Uplate Live. During her performance, a clip of her music video was shown. She also performed the song on Happy Yipee Yehey! and on myx in 2013.

Awards
 MYX Music Awards 2011, Favorite Music Video
 MYX Music Awards 2011, Favorite Song

Cover versions
On January 1, 2011, American singer/songwriter David DiMuzio covered the song, which is uploaded on YouTube.

References

2010 singles
Yeng Constantino songs
2010 songs
Star Music singles
Tagalog-language songs